Sekou Oumar Sylla (born 9 January 1999) is a professional footballer who plays as a left back for Eredivisie club SC Cambuur. Born in the Netherlands, he plays for the Guinea national team.

Career
Born in Schiedam, Sylla started his career at Excelsior Maassluis before signing for Eerste Divisie side TOP Oss on an amateur contract in summer 2021. He transferred on a free transfer to Eredivisie club SC Cambuur in January 2022, signing an 18-month contract.

International career
Born in the Netherlands, Sylla is of Guinean descent. He debuted with the Guinea national team in a friendly 0–0 tie with South Africa on 25 March 2022.

References

External links
S. Sylla at Voetbal International

1999 births
Living people
Footballers from Schiedam
Guinean footballers
Guinea international footballers
Dutch footballers
Dutch people of Guinean descent
Association football defenders
Excelsior Maassluis players
TOP Oss players
SC Cambuur players
Tweede Divisie players
Eerste Divisie players
Eredivisie players